Michael Balfour may refer to:

Michael Balfour (historian) (1908–1995), English historian and civil servant
Michael Balfour, 1st Lord Balfour of Burleigh (died 1619), Scottish peer
Sir Michael Balfour, 4th Baronet (1634–1698) of the Balfour baronets
Sir Michael Balfour, 5th Baronet (1676–1709) of the Balfour baronets
Sir Michael Balfour, 6th Baronet (died 1750) of the Balfour baronets
Michael Balfour (actor) (1918–1997), English actor in The Krays film

See also
Balfour (surname)